Greatest Hits is a greatest hits album by British pop duo Eurythmics, released on 18 March 1991 by RCA Records. It contains their successful singles spanning the years 1982 through 1990. The album topped the charts in the United Kingdom for a total of 10 weeks and in Australia for seven weeks. It remains the duo's best-selling album worldwide and has been certified six-times platinum in the United Kingdom and triple platinum in the United States. Phil Sutcliffe in Q Magazine noted that "this compilation portrays, for once, a band accorded precise justice by the singles charts". 

The original European version of the album contains 18 tracks, while the version released in the US contains only 14. The five songs omitted from the US edition are "Right by Your Side", "Sexcrime (Nineteen Eighty-Four)", "It's Alright (Baby's Coming Back)", "You Have Placed a Chill in My Heart" and "The Miracle of Love", while "The King and Queen of America" is added. The track order also differs.

Track listing

Personnel
Credits adapted from the liner notes of Greatest Hits.

 David A. Stewart – production 
 Adam Williams – production 
 Jimmy Iovine – production 
 Jon Bavin – engineering 
 Fred Defaye – engineering 
 Eric Thorngren – engineering 
 Manu Guiot – engineering 
 Sophie Muller – cover picture
 Laurence Stevens – art, design
 Annie Lennox – art, design

Charts

Weekly charts

Year-end charts

Certifications

Video version

A version of the compilation with 21 music videos was also released, on VHS in 1991, and on DVD in 2000. Although it includes three more songs than the European audio version, and seven more than the US audio version, it still omits the videos for the singles "Never Gonna Cry Again" (1981), "The Walk" (1982), "Shame" (1987) and "Revival" (1989). In contrast to the audio versions of the compilation, the music videos are presented in chronological order, with short collages (made from snippets from the videos) between the songs.

Charts

Certifications

References

1991 greatest hits albums
1991 video albums
Albums produced by David A. Stewart
Albums produced by Jimmy Iovine
Bertelsmann Music Group video albums
Eurythmics compilation albums
Eurythmics video albums
RCA Records compilation albums
Music video compilation albums